General Keppel may refer to:

George Keppel, 3rd Earl of Albemarle (1724–1772), British Army colonel general
George Keppel, 6th Earl of Albemarle (1799–1891), British Army general
William Keppel (British Army officer, born 1727) (1727–1782), British Army lieutenant general
William Keppel (British Army officer, died 1834), British Army general

See also
Willem van Keppel, 2nd Earl of Albemarle (1702–1754), British lieutenant general

Other
  – A British privateer (1799–1801)